Jean-Marc Vacheron (1731–1805) was a Swiss horologist and a founder of the Vacheron Constantin watch company. He was a close friend of leading Enlightenment philosophers Jean-Jacques Rousseau and Voltaire due to their common interests in philosophy, science and watchmaking.

Early life
Jean-Marc Vacheron was born in 1731 in Geneva, Switzerland. His father was Jean-Jacques Vacheron.

Career
Vacheron opened his watch shop in 1755.

His timepieces naturally bore the name "Jean-Marc Vacheron". At that time he was 24 years old and was one of many cabinotiers-watchmakers who specialized in the production of certain components, selling them to so-called etablisseurs. The watchmakers were called cabinotiers in honor of the well-lit cabinets on the top floors of the houses in Geneva's Saint-Gervais neighborhood, where they worked.

Personal life
Vacheron had five children. His sons Louis Andre (born in 1755) and Abraham (born in 1760) followed in his footsteps.

Death
He died in 1805.

References

Sources
 WatchTime Magazine - Edition Vacheron Constantin special (October 2009)

1731 births
1805 deaths
18th-century businesspeople from the Republic of Geneva
Swiss watchmakers (people)